The 2019 Australian Figure Skating Championships were held from 30 November to 6 December at the O'Brien Icehouse in Melbourne, Victoria. Medals were awarded in the disciplines of men's singles, ladies singles, pair skating, ice dancing and synchronized skating at the senior, junior, advanced novice, intermediate novice, and basic novice level. The results were part of the selection criteria for events including the 2020 Four Continents Championships, 2020 World Junior Championships, and the 2020 World Championships.

Qualifying

Medals (Novice, Junior, Senior)

Medal summary

Senior

Junior

Advanced Novice

Senior results

Senior men

Senior ladies

Senior pairs

Senior dance

Senior synchronized

Junior results

Junior men

Junior ladies

Junior pairs

Junior dance

Junior synchronized

Advanced Novice

Advanced Novice boys

Advanced Novice girls

Advanced Novice pairs

Advanced Novice dance

Advanced Novice synchronized

International team selections for 2020 ISU Championships

World Championships

Junior World Championships

World Synchronized Skating Championships

World Junior Synchronized Skating Championships

Four Continents

References 

2019-20
2020 in figure skating
2019 in figure skating
Figure Skating Championships,2019-20
Figure Skating Championships,2019-20